Si-eun, also spelled Shi-eun, or See-un, Shee-un, Si-un, Shi-un, Si-en, Shi-en, is a Korean feminine given name. The meaning differs based on the hanja used to write each syllable of the name. There are 54 hanja with the reading  "shi" and 30 hanja with the reading "eun" on the South Korean government's official list of hanja which may be used in given names.

People
People with this name include:

Lee Si-eun (born 1970), South Korean actress
Park Si-eun (born Park Eun-young, 1980), South Korean actress
Ha Si-eun (born Lee Si-eun, 1984), South Korean actress
Joo Si-eun (born 1992), South Korean announcer
Ahn Si-eun (born 1993), South Korean actress
Lee Si-eun (born 1994), South Korean singer
Choe Si-eun (born 1995), South Korean announcer
Kim Si-eun (born 1999), South Korean actress
Kim Si-eun (born 2000), South Korean actress
Park Si-eun (born 2001), South Korean actress and singer, member of STAYC

Fictional characters
Fictional characters with this name include:

Kim Shi-eun, female character in 2006 South Korean film Lump Sugar
Shi-eun, female character in 2015 South Korean film Fatal Intuition
Jang Shi-eun, female character in 2015 South Korean television series Super Daddy Yeol
Lee Shi-eun, female character in 2018 South Korean television series A Poem a Day
Kim Shi-eun, female character in 2018 South Korean television series Just Dance
Shi-eun, female character in 2018 South Korean film Back from the Beat
Oh Shi-eun, female character in 2020 South Korean television series Touch

See also
List of Korean given names

References

Korean feminine given names